Dogbane, dog-bane, dog's bane, and other variations, some of them regional and some transient, are names for certain plants that are reputed to kill or repel dogs; "bane" originally meant "slayer", and was later applied to plants to indicate that they were poisonous to particular creatures.

History of the term
The earliest reference to such names in common English usage was in the 16th century, in which they were applied to various plants in the Apocynaceae, in particular Apocynum. Some plants in the Asclepiadoideae, now a subfamily of the Apocynaceae, but until recently regarded as the separate family Asclepiadaceae, were also called dogbane even before the two families were united. It is not clear how much earlier the name had been in use in the English language, which originated about 1000 years earlier in mediaeval times. However, centuries before the appearance of the English language, Pedanius Dioscorides, in his De Materia Medica, had already described members of the Apocynaceae, such as Apocynum and Cynanchum by names equivalent to "dogbane"; Apocynum literally means "dog killer" or "dog remover", and "Cynanchum" means "dog strangler". In modern times some species of Nerium, Periploca and Trachelospermum, also in the Apocynaceae, are called dogbane or variants such as "climbing dogbane".

Modern significance of the term "dogbane family"
Some modern sources restrict "dogbane" in its strict sense to the genus Apocynum, but it is doubtful that any such narrow definition could be justified even if it were enforceable. More widely, when authors refer to the "dogbane family" without qualification, they almost always mean Apocynaceae.

"Dogbane" as a term outside the family Apocynaceae
Common names, either informal or vernacular, are seldom definitive, let alone stable. Some poisonous or offensive plants in practically unrelated families had similar common names in the vernacular and writings of various times; for example an edition De Materia Medica, apparently of the early sixteenth century, mentions that species of Aconitum (family Ranunculaceae) were known as either "dog killer" (or murderer) or "wolf killer" ("...Sunt qui Cynoctonon: qui Lycoctonon... uocent"). Again, in modern times Isocoma menziesii in the family Asteraceae is known in some regions as dogbane.

Recent aberrant application of the term
The term "dogbane", either in genuine confusion or as a deliberate sales ploy, has been applied without obvious justification to various groups of plants, such as some species of Plectranthus, a genus in the catnip subfamily Nepetoideae of the mint family Lamiaceae. None have been reported to be especially harmful to dogs or cats, but some have been said to emit repellent essential oils when bruised, discouraging pets from visiting garden beds.

References

Apocynaceae
Plant common names